Adoxophyes rhopalodesma is a species of moth of the family Tortricidae. It is found on Waigeu Island in Indonesia.

References

Moths described in 1961
Adoxophyes
Moths of Indonesia